Pakri pakohi is a village in Muzaffarpur district of Bihar, India. This village is about 5 km west of Bhagwanpur and is located under the Marwan block.  The village is connected with a road from Muzaffarpur to Rewa called Rewa road.  The nearest railway station is Muzaffarpur (about 7 km) and the nearest airport is Muzaffarpur Airport (about 1 km). The postal code is 843113.

The village has two primary school,a middle school, three madrasah and the education is available up to 12th standard. Major festivals celebrated include Bela, Eid-ul-Fitar, Eid-ul-Adha, Holi, Durga Puja, Diwali, and Chhath.

The Mukhia of the village is Mohammad Faiyaz.

Pakahi Khas Village
Pakahi Khas is one of the villages in Muzaffarpur district. Pakahi Khas is in Marwan block. The total population of the village is 5,582. The literacy rate is 41.29%. The female literacy rate is 31.02%. The male literacy rate is 50.42%.

The number of households in Pakahi Khas is 835. All the households are rural households. Female to male ratio of Pakahi Khas is 91.16% compared to the Bihar's female to male ratio 91.93%.

The literacy rate of the village is 41.29% compared to the literacy rate of state 47%. The literacy rate of the village is less than state literacy rate. The rate of literacy is very low and needs immediate attention of Union and State Government. The female literacy rate is 31.02% compared to male literacy rate of 50.44%.

The total working population is 33.18% of the total population. 58.35% of the men are working population . 4.93% of the women are working population. The main working population is 29.35% of the total population. 51.59% of the men are main working population . 4.41% of the women are main working population . While the marginal working population is 3.82% of the total population. 6.77% of the men are marginal working population. 0.52% of the women are marginal working population.

The total non-working population is 66.82% of the total population. 41.65% of the men are non-working population . 95.07% of the women are non-working population.

Demographics Census 2001
Vital Statistics

Parameters	Total (Rural)	Male	Female

Population	5,582	2,920	2,662

Population Below 6 years	1,109	555	554

Scheduled Caste	947	481	466

Scheduled Tribe	0	0	0

Literate	1,847	1,193	654

Working Population	1,484	1,380	104

Main Working Population	1,313	1,220	93

Marginal Working Population	171	160	11

Non Working Population	4,098	1,540	2,558

Main Working Agricultural Laborer Population	450	427	23

Main Working Cultivator Population	229	221	8

Main Working House Works Population	131	94	37

Main Working Others Population	503	478	25

Marginal Working Agricultural Laborer Population	151	142	9

Marginal Working Cultivator Population	8	8	0

Marginal Working House Works Population	4	2	2

Marginal Working Others Population	8	8	0

Villages in Muzaffarpur district